Parribacus perlatus, the Easter Island mitten lobster, is a species of slipper lobster found around Easter Island in the Pacific Ocean.

Description

Distribution and habitat
Panulirus pascuensis is native to the coast of Easter Island in the south eastern Pacific Ocean.

References

Achelata
Edible crustaceans
Crustaceans of the eastern Pacific Ocean
IUCN Red List data deficient species
Fauna of Easter Island
Crustaceans described in 1967
Pascuense cuisine